Aleksandr Liferenko (born 1930) is a Soviet water polo player. He competed in the men's tournament at the 1952 Summer Olympics.

References

External links
 

1930 births
Possibly living people
Soviet male water polo players
Olympic water polo players of the Soviet Union
Water polo players at the 1952 Summer Olympics
Place of birth missing (living people)